Alice Eleanor Cossey (8 November 1879 – 14 March 1970) was a New Zealand tailor and union leader. She was born in Drury, Auckland, New Zealand on 8 November 1879. She was one of the first professional female unionists in New Zealand. Alongside Lena Purcell of the Auckland Retail Shop Assistants' Union, she was one of the most influential female unionists in Auckland until her retirement in 1945.

Cossey represented the Auckland Tailoresses Union in the Arbitration Court in 1947 where she argued for equal pay for women.

References

1879 births
1970 deaths
New Zealand trade unionists